Matthew Liptak (born 30 April 1970) is a former professional Australian rules footballer who played for the Adelaide Football Club in the Australian Football League (AFL). He is also an orthopaedic surgeon, receiving his medical degree from Flinders University in Adelaide.

From Glenelg, Liptak was a determined inside midfielder with good goal kicking skills. Liptak's best season was 1996, in which he won the Best and Fairest and represented South Australia in State of Origin.

References

External links
 
 

Adelaide Football Club players
Malcolm Blight Medal winners
Glenelg Football Club players
Australian rules footballers from South Australia
Flinders University alumni
1970 births
Living people
21st-century Australian medical doctors
South Australian State of Origin players
People educated at Sacred Heart College, Adelaide